Dervish, Darvesh, or Darwīsh (from , Darvīsh) in Islam can refer broadly to members of a Sufi fraternity (tariqah), or more narrowly to a religious mendicant, who chose or accepted material poverty. The latter usage is found particularly in Persian and Turkish (derviş) as well as in Amazigh (Aderwish), corresponding to the Arabic term faqīr. Their focus is on the universal values of love and service, deserting the illusions of ego (nafs) to reach God. In most Sufi orders, a dervish is known to practice dhikr through physical exertions or religious practices to attain the ecstatic trance to reach God. Their most popular practice is Sama, which is associated with the 13th-century mystic Rumi. In folklore and with adherents of Sufism, dervishes are often credited with the ability to perform miracles and ascribed supernatural powers. Historically, the term Dervish has also been used more loosely, as the designation of various Islamic political movements or military entities.

Etymology
The Persian word darvīsh is of ancient origin and descends from a Proto-Iranian word that appears in Avestan as  "needy, mendicant", via Middle Persian driyosh. It has the same meaning as the Arabic word faqīr, meaning people whose contingency and utter dependence upon God is manifest in everything they do and every breath they take.

Religious practice
Dervishes try to approach God by virtues and individual experience, rather than by religious scholarship.
Many dervishes are mendicant ascetics who have taken a vow of poverty, unlike mullahs. The main reason they beg is to learn humility, but dervishes are prohibited to beg for their own good. They have to give the collected money to other poor people. Others work in common professions; Egyptian Qadiriyya – known in Turkey as Kadiri – are fishermen, for example.

Some classical writers indicate that the poverty of the dervish is not merely economic. Saadi, for instance, who himself travelled widely as a dervish, and wrote extensively about them, says in his Gulistan:

Rumi writes in Book 1 of his Masnavi:

Whirling dervishes

The whirling dance or Sufi whirling that is proverbially associated with dervishes is best known in the West by the practices (performances) of the Mevlevi order in Turkey, and is part of a formal ceremony known as the Sama. It is, however, also practiced by other orders. The Sama is only one of the many Sufi ceremonies performed to try to reach religious ecstasy (majdhb, fana). The name Mevlevi comes from the Persian poet Rumi, who was a dervish himself. This practice, though not intended as entertainment, has become a tourist attraction in Turkey.

Orders

There are various orders of dervishes, almost all of which trace their origins from various Muslim saints and teachers, especially Imam Ali. Various orders and suborders have appeared and disappeared over the centuries. Dervishes spread into North Africa, the Horn of Africa, Turkey, Anatolia, the Balkans, the Caucasus, Central Asia, Iran, Pakistan, India, Afghanistan, and Tajikistan.

Other dervish groups include the Bektashis, who are connected to the janissaries, and the Senussi, who are rather orthodox in their beliefs. Other fraternities and subgroups chant verses of the Qur'an, play drums or whirl in groups, all according to their specific traditions. They practice meditation, as is the case with most of the Sufi orders in South Asia, many of whom owe allegiance to, or were influenced by, the Chishti order. Each fraternity uses its own garb and methods of acceptance and initiation, some of which may be rather severe. The form of Sufi dervishism practised during the 17th century was centered upon esotericism, patience and pacifism.

Other historical uses

Mahdists

Various western historical writers have sometimes used the term dervish rather loosely, linking it to, among other things, the Mahdist War in Sudan and other conflicts by Islamic military leaders. In such cases, the term "dervishes" may have been used as a generic (and often pejorative) term for the opposing Islamic entity and all members of its military, political and religious institutions, including persons who would not be considered "dervishes" in the strict sense.

During the Mahdist War, Muḥammad Aḥmad al-Mahdī decreed that all those who came to join him should be called anṣār, after the Prophet's earliest followers. He forbade the use of the term ‘dervish’ to describe his followers. Despite this, British soldiers and colonial officials continued to use the term in relation to the anṣār. While some Britons used the term to denigrate the followers of the Mahdī, it was also used with a sense of admiration in accounts by British soldiers which describe the fearlessness and bravery of the lightly armed 'dervishes'. Thus, the word has become closely associated with the anṣār and is often used inaccurately in relation to the Mahdi's followers, even today.

For example, a contemporary British drawing of the fighting in Sudan was entitled "The defeat of the dervishes at Toski" (see History of Sudan (1884–1898)#British response).

In literature 
Various books discussing the lives of Dervishes can be found in Turkish literature. Death and the Dervish by Meša Selimović and The Dervish by Frances Kazan extensively discussed the life of a Dervish. 
Similar works on the subject have been found in other books such as Memoirs of a Dervish: Sufis, Mystics and the Sixties by Robert Erwin. 
Majdeddin Ali Bagher Ne'matollahi has Said that Sufism is a core of being and bridge between religion and science.

Views on Dervishes 
Dervishes and their Sufis practices are accepted by traditional Sunni Muslims but different groups such as Deobandis, Salafis disregard various practices of Dervishes as un-Islamic.

Gallery

See also

 Derviş, a variant of the spelling
 Fakir
 Qalandariyya
 The Tale of the Four Dervishes Qissa Chahar Dervish
 Death and the Dervish, a novel by Yugoslav writer Meša Selimović (published in 1966)

References

 
Islamic honorifics
Sacred dance
Sufism
Islamic mysticism
Mysticism
Religious orders
Islamic orders